Marathon is a village within the town of Marathon in Cortland County, New York, United States. The population of the village was 919 at the 2010 census, out of 1,967 in the entire town.

History 
The village is within the former Central New York Military Tract and was incorporated in 1861.

Marathon hosts a yearly "Maple Festival" in the spring.

The Peck Memorial Library and Tarbell Building are listed on the National Register of Historic Places.

Geography
Marathon village is located in the western part of the town of Marathon at  (42.443633, -76.036846). It is at the junction of U.S. Route 11, Interstate 81, and New York State Route 221.

The Tioughnioga River, part of the Susquehanna River watershed, flows southward through the village.

Demographics

As of the census of 2000, there were 1,063 people, 419 households, and 286 families residing in the village. The population density was 941.4 people per square mile (363.2/km2). There were 439 housing units at an average density of 388.8 per square mile (150.0/km2). The racial makeup of the village was 98.97% White, 0.38% Black or African American, 0.19% Native American, 0.09% from other races, and 0.38% from two or more races. Hispanic or Latino of any race were 0.56% of the population.

There were 419 households, out of which 36.3% had children under the age of 18 living with them, 49.6% were married couples living together, 13.4% had a female householder with no husband present, and 31.7% were non-families. 26.7% of all households were made up of individuals, and 11.9% had someone living alone who was 65 years of age or older. The average household size was 2.54 and the average family size was 3.03.

In the village, the population was spread out, with 29.2% under the age of 18, 8.1% from 18 to 24, 26.7% from 25 to 44, 22.9% from 45 to 64, and 13.2% who were 65 years of age or older. The median age was 36 years. For every 100 females, there were 82.6 males. For every 100 females age 18 and over, there were 81.9 males.

The median income for a household in the village was $32,639, and the median income for a family was $42,000. Males had a median income of $31,538 versus $23,500 for females. The per capita income for the village was $16,379. About 11.4% of families and 12.4% of the population were below the poverty line, including 10.9% of those under age 18 and 17.5% of those age 65 or over.

References

External links
  Village of Marathon government

Villages in New York (state)
Villages in Cortland County, New York